Coleophora feomicrella is a moth of the family Coleophoridae. It is found in North Africa.

References

feomicrella
Moths described in 1988
Moths of Africa